The Journal of Behavioral Decision Making is a peer-reviewed academic journal covering the study of psychological decision-making processes. It was established in 1988 and is published five times per year by John Wiley & Sons. The editor-in-chief is George Wright (Strathclyde Business School). According to the Journal Citation Reports, the journal has a 2020 impact factor of 2.438, ranking it 52nd out of 83 journals in the category "Psychology, Applied".

References

External links

Applied psychology journals
Wiley (publisher) academic journals
Publications established in 1988
English-language journals
Decision-making
5 times per year journals